The 1974 Cal State Northridge  Matadors football team represented California State University, Northridge as a member of the California Collegiate Athletic Association (CCAA) during the 1974 NCAA Division II football season. Led by second-year head coach Gary Torgeson, Cal State Northridge compiled an overall record of 2–9 with a mark of 1–3 in conference play, placing fourth in the CCAA. The team was outscored by its opponents 265 to 126 for the season and was held to less than 10 points five times. The Matadors played home games at North Campus Stadium in Northridge, California.

Schedule

References

Cal State Northridge
Cal State Northridge Matadors football seasons
Cal State Northridge Matadors football